The Celestial Toymaker is a fictional character in the long-running British science fiction television series, Doctor Who. He was played by Michael Gough, and featured in the 1966 story The Celestial Toymaker by Brian Hayles.

Character overview
The Toymaker is immortal, having already lived for millions of years.  Having been cast out from an alternative universe, he obeys a different set of physical laws.  The years of isolation have driven him mad, and he seeks distraction in the playing of games.

If the Toymaker loses a game, his world is destroyed (although he is powerful enough to rebuild it). If a contestant loses, he is added to the game as a toy, and if he wins, he is destroyed with the world. Either way, the contestant cannot win; the reward for both failure and success is the same: eternal existence at the Toymaker's side. The Toymaker is manipulative and can turn people, as the First Doctor comments, "into his playthings". As he demonstrates, he is a being of great power, judging from how he effortlessly makes the Doctor invisible and, for a while, mute.

He uses his enormous power for self-satisfaction and bullying, such as threatening to break Sergeant Rugg and Mrs. Wiggs like a stack of plates.

Other appearances
The Toymaker appears in the novelization of the unmade serial The Nightmare Fair by Graham Williams, in a story set in Blackpool. The Sixth Doctor and Peri defeat the Toymaker, and leave him sealed inside a forcefield maintained by his own thoughts, trapped for the remainder of his life.

The Toymaker made his first comic strip appearance in 1981, in a back-up strip titled The Greatest Gamble, written by John Peel and drawn by Mike McMahon, and first published in Doctor Who Magazine #56. In the story, the Toymaker plays a game of cards against a gambler named Gaylord Lefevre on a Mississippi riverboat in the late 19th century.

The Toymaker then appeared in the Doctor Who Magazine comic strip End Game, written by Alan Barnes and published in DWM #244-#247. In End Game, he took the entire town of Stockbridge as his playing board to try to defeat the Eighth Doctor, using the Ultimate Weapon of a mirror which created clockwork duplicates. However, the Doctor turned this plan on its executor, creating a duplicate of the Toymaker hell-bent on playing games for ever, at which point he was cast into a dimensional void.

The Toymaker next featured in the Past Doctor Adventures novel Divided Loyalties by Gary Russell. Divided Loyalties reveals that he encountered the Doctor prior to the events of The Celestial Toymaker, where he possessed the body of the Doctor's schoolfriend Rallon to use as a permanent host. This story also reveals that the Toymaker is one of the Guardians, representing dreams in the same way as the White Guardian represents order, and the Black Guardian represents chaos. The story also features Gaylord Lefevre from The Greatest Gamble. At the conclusion of the story, despite the Toymaker's attempts to turn the Fifth Doctor's companions against him, he is defeated when Rallon expels the Toymaker from his body by triggering all twelve of his regenerations at once, the Toymaker subsequently being 'possessed' by Rallon's Watcher to keep him in check in future (Hence accounting for the Toymaker's different personality during his appearance in The Nightmare Fair; with Rallon's Watcher now his host rather than Rallon himself, it is as though the Toymaker himself has regenerated, changing minor but crucial aspects of his personality).

The cancelled story The Nightmare Fair was resurrected by Big Finish Productions, and released in November 2009.  Colin Baker and Nicola Bryant returned as the Doctor and Peri but, as Michael Gough had retired, the part of the Toymaker was played by David Bailie, who had previously played Dask in the 1977 story The Robots of Death.  However, seven months before Fair's release, The Toymaker makes a surprise appearance against the Seventh Doctor in the audio story The Magic Mousetrap, his power having been divided among his last group of opponents when the Doctor manipulated him into playing multiple games at once.  In this story, the Toymaker is played by Paul Antony-Barber.  David Bailie returns to the role in the Eighth Doctor and Charley Pollard Companion Chronicles audio story Solitaire.

List of appearances

Television
The Celestial Toymaker

Audio plays
 The Nightmare Fair
 Solitaire
 The Magic Mousetrap

Novels
 The Nightmare Fair
 Divided Loyalties

References

Television characters introduced in 1966
Recurring characters in Doctor Who
Extraterrestrial supervillains
Fictional toymakers and toy inventors
Male characters in television